The sixth season of the animated comedy series Bob's Burgers began airing on Fox in the United States on September 27, 2015, and concluded on May 22, 2016. The season contained 19 episodes.

Production
On January 8, 2015, the series was renewed for a sixth production cycle, which aired as part of the sixth broadcast season, which also included 13 holdover episodes from the fifth production cycle. 

This season featured guest appearances from Steve Buscemi, Paul Rudd, Wanda Sykes, and Henry Winkler.

Episodes

References

External links
 Official website
 
 

2015 American television seasons
2016 American television seasons
Bob's Burgers seasons